Ochraethes is a genus of beetles in the family Cerambycidae.

Species 
Ochraethes contains the following species:

 Ochraethes brevicornis (Chevrolat, 1860)
 Ochraethes cinereolus (Bates, 1892)
 Ochraethes citrinus (Chevrolat, 1860)
 Ochraethes confusus Perez-Flores & Toledo-Hernandez, 2022
 Ochraethes dimidiaticornis (Chevrolat, 1860)
 Ochraethes nevadensis Heffern, Botero & Santos-Silva, 2020
 Ochraethes nigrescens Chemsak & Linsley, 1974
 Ochraethes nigroapicalis Perez-Flores & Toledo-Hernandez, 2022
 Ochraethes nigropunctatus (Chevrolat, 1860)
 Ochraethes obliquus (Chevrolat, 1860)
 Ochraethes obscuricornis Bates, 1892
 Ochraethes palmeri Bates, 1880
 Ochraethes picticornis Bates, 1880
 Ochraethes pollinosus (Chevrolat, 1835)
 Ochraethes skillmani Wappes, Santos-Silva & Botero, 2018
 Ochraethes sommeri (Chevrolat, 1835)
 Ochraethes tomentosus (Chevrolat, 1860)
 Ochraethes tulensis Bates, 1892
 Ochraethes umbratilis Bates, 1885
 Ochraethes viridiventris (Chevrolat, 1860)
 Ochraethes z-littera (Chevrolat, 1860)

References

 
Clytini